

Buildings and structures

Buildings

 1570–1575 – Palazzo Barbaran da Porto in Vicenza (in the Veneto), designed by Andrea Palladio, is built.
 1571 – Buildings begun in 1568 are completed:
 The Green Gate in Gdańsk, designed by Regnier (or Reiner) van Amsterdam.
 The Hall of Antiquities (Antiquarium) in the Munich Residenz, designed by Wilhelm Egkl and Jacopo Strada.
 1571–1572 – Loggia of Palazzo del Capitaniato in Vicenza, designed by Palladio, is built.
 1572 – Humayun's Tomb in Delhi, designed by Mirak Mirza Ghiyas, is completed.
 c. 1572 – Completion of work (part of main courtyard) at Villa Serego, Santa Sofia di Pedemonte in the province of Verona, designed by Palladio.
 1573 – Construction of Mexico City Cathedral begins.
 1574
 The Selimiye Mosque (Edirne), designed by Mimar Sinan and begun in 1568, is completed.
 Rebuilding of Castle Ashby House in England is begun.
 1576 – The Pagoda of Cishou Temple in the suburbs of Beijing is completed.
 1576–1577 – Design for church of Il Redentore on Giudecca in Venice commissioned from Palladio and construction begins.
 1577 – Mehmed Paša Sokolović Bridge over the Drina at Višegrad in the Ottoman Empire, designed by Mimar Sinan, is completed.
 1579 – Nonsuch House erected on London Bridge.
 Fatehpur Sikri in the Mughal Empire is completed.

Events
 1570 – Andrea Palladio publishes I Quattro Libri dell'Architettura (The Four Books of Architecture).
 1573 – Philip II of Spain signs the Laws of the Indies which determine community planning in his overseas possessions.
 1576–79 – Jacques I Androuet du Cerceau publishes Les plus excellents bastiments de France in Paris with engraved illustrations.
 1578 – Giacomo della Porta builds a fountain in front of the Pantheon, Rome.

Births
 1571 – Salomon de Brosse, French architect (died 1626)
 1573: July 15 – Inigo Jones, English architect and theatrical designer (died 1652)
 1576 – Santino Solari, Italian-born architect (died 1646)

Deaths
 1570
 January 8 – Philibert de l'Orme, French architect (born c. 1510)
 October 20 – Francesco Laparelli, Italian architect and engineer (born 1521)
 November 27 – Jacopo Sansovino, Italian architect and sculptor (born 1486)
 1572: December 30 – Galeazzo Alessi, Italian architect (born 1512)
 1573: July 7 – Giacomo Barozzi da Vignola, Italian mannerist architect (born 1507)
 1574: June 27 – Giorgio Vasari, Italian painter, architect and art historian (born 1511)
 1578: September – Pierre Lescot, French architect (born 1510)

References

Architecture